Events in the year 1981 in Norway.

Incumbents
 Monarch – Olav V
 Prime Minister – Odvar Nordli (Labour Party) until 4 February, Gro Harlem Brundtland (Labour Party) until 14 October, Kåre Willoch (Conservative Party)

Events

 4 February – Brundtland's First Cabinet was appointed. Gro Harlem Brundtland becomes the first female Prime Minister of Norway
 14 October – The government of Gro Harlem Brundtland resigns
 14 October – Willoch's First Cabinet was appointed.
 5 November – Five people are killed when a seaplane crashes in the Forsand municipality.
 6 December – The 1981 Parliamentary election takes place.
 Norway becomes the first country in the world to enact a law to prevent discrimination against homosexuals.
 The Hessdalen light UFO phenomenon emerged in December and occurred with high frequency for the next several years.

Popular culture

Sports

Music

Film

Literature

Notable births

January

8 January – Kristin Mürer Stemland, cross-country skier.
9 January – Ole Erevik, handball player.
9 January – Christian Møllerop, LGBT rights activist
12 January – Solveig Gulbrandsen, footballer
18 January – Maria Parr, children's writer.
18 January – Martin Taxt, jazz musician
19 January – Bjørn Arve Lund, footballer
27 January – Thomas Løvold, curler
28 January – Erlend Hanstveit, footballer

February

3 February – Guri Melby, politician
13 February – Ingrid Lønningdal, artist
19 February – Thomas Holm, footballer
25 February – Anne Solsvik, politician 
28 February – Tjostolv Moland, army officer and security contractor (died 2013)

March

5 March – Mazyar Keshvari, politician
7 March – Mona Fastvold, filmmaker and actress
8 March – Jonas Solberg Andersen, ice hockey player
17 March – Simen Brenne, footballer
18 March – Tora Berger, biathlete
18 March – Ingrid Olava, singer and musician
21 March – Leni Larsen Kaurin, footballer
21 March – Arcane Station, musician, producer and songwriter
23 March – Ragnhild Kvarberg, middle distance and long-distance runner
25 March – Cato Sundberg, musician
25 March – Roy Hegreberg, road bicycle racer
28 March – Jan Grue, writer and linguist.

April

1 April – Helene Bøksle, singer and actress
1 April – Bjørn Einar Romøren, ski jumper
2 April – Patrick Holtet, footballer
7 April – Amund Maarud, blues/rock musician and composer
8 April – Nils Bech, singer
8 April – Mari Hagen, politician
9 April – Charlotte Frogner, actress
15 April – Jon Reidar Øyan, gay rights activist and politician
18 April – Hedvig Bjelkevik, speed skater 
19 April – Lise Klaveness, lawyer and footballer.
19 April – Jan Gunnar Solli, footballer
23 April – Lars-Henrik Paarup Michelsen, politician 
27 April – Hilde Marie Kjersem, artist, musician and songwriter
30 April – Kristin Størmer Steira, cross-country skier

May

14 May – Iselin Nybø, politician
19 May – Janicke Gunvaldsen, racing cyclist
25 May – Anette Trettebergstuen, politician
27 May – Hanne Blåfjelldal, politician

June
3 June – Kristoffer Paulsen Vatshaug, footballer
4 June – Linn Nyrønning, footballere
4 June – Jan Trygve Røyneland, television and film writer
12 June – Afua Hirsch, writer, broadcaster, and former barrister
16 June – Ola Kvernberg, jazz violinist and composer.
16 June – Richard Skog, strongman competitor
16 June – Knut Walde, footballer
20 June – Brede Hangeland, footballer
20 June – Lene Storløkken, footballer.

July

1 July – Kirsti Bergstø, politician
13 July – Sigurd Hole, jazz musician
16 July – Vigdis Hårsaker, handball player
18 July – Sturla Torkildsen, fencer
19 July – Anne Lise Frøkedal, singer-songwriter
23 July – Lisa Aisato, illustrator and visual artist.
27 July – Sverre Krogh Sundbø, poker player
28 July – Lars Fredrik Frøislie, musician
28 July – Frank Kjosås, actor
29 July – Gjermund Larsen, traditional folk musician and composer

August
1 August – Pia Haraldsen, TV personality
3 August – Ingvild Stensland, footballer
3 August – Erlend Tvinnereim, operatic tenor
7 August – Ingvill Måkestad Bovim, track and field athlete
7 August – Ann Iren Mørkved, footballer
9 August – Azar Karadaş, soccer player
21 August – Jon Engen-Helgheim, politician
28 August – Marius Johnsen, footballer

September
1 September – Inger Lise Hansen, politician
3 September – Fredrik Klock, footballer
8 September – Morten Gamst Pedersen, footballer
10 September – Morten Adamsen, competition rower.
11 September – Vemund Brekke Skard, footballer
22 September – Ingrid Vetlesen, soprano
23 September – Ryan Wiik, actor and entrepreneur
25 September – Leo Olsen, footballer
27 September – Espen Hægeland, footballer
28 September – Cecilia Brækhus, professional boxer and kickboxer

October
8 October – Sten Ove Eike, footballer
13 October – Vidar Norheim, drummer and songwriter
24 October – Fredrik Mikkelsen, musician and composer
28 October – Andreas Loven, jazz pianist
29 October – Lene Alexandra, singer and model
30 October – Lars Petter Sveen, novelist.

November
3 November – Gunhild Følstad, footballer
20 November – Marit Tveite Bystøl, ski mountaineer
20 November – Espen Hoff, footballer
30 November – Belinda Braza, singer, choreographer, artist and actor

December

6 December – Morten Værnes, ice sledge hockey player
17 December – Kim Myhr, guitarist and composer
19 December – Bjørnar Moxnes, politician
19 December – Espen Nystuen, footballer
20 December – John Olav Nilsen, singer and songwriter
24 December – Solveig Heilo, composer, artist, musician, music producer, arranger, designer and costume designer

Full date missing
Lars Akerhaug, journalist and non-fiction author
Ivar Loe Bjørnstad, jazz and rock musician
Marius Bjugan, orienteering competitor
Ida Hegazi Høyer, writer
Annette Münch, children's writer, playwright and non-fiction writer.
Øystein Kvaal Østerbø, orienteering competitor.
Kjersti Reenaas, ski-orienteering competitor 
Julian Skar, composer and multi-media artist
Todd Terje, DJ, songwriter, and record producer

Notable deaths

3 January – Karl Evang, physician and civil servant (born 1902). 
4 January – Aage Thor Falkanger Sr., judge (born 1902)
9 January – Jack Nielsen, tennis player (born 1896) 
12 January – Olav Marensius Strandås, politician (born 1900)
16 January – Birger Haug, high jumper (born 1908)
20 January – Richard Frydenlund, wrestler (born 1891) 
22 January – Torgeir Svendsen, politician (born 1910).
29 January – Karl Ludvig Bugge, civil servant (born 1902) 
1 February – Geirr Tveitt, composer and pianist (born 1908)
11 February – Haakon Olsen Wika, politician (born 1899)
12 February – Trygve de Lange, lawyer (born 1918) 
11 March – Jonas Enge, politician (born 1908)
30 March – Christian L. Holm, politician (born 1892)
4 April – Aanund Bjørnsson Berdal, engineer (born 1888).
15 April – Birger Brekke, Scout leader (born 1891) 
15 April – Anton Fredrik Klaveness, equestrian and ship-owner (born 1903) 
28 April – Kristian Horn, botanist and humanist (born 1903) 
5 May – Rolf Bloch Hansen, military officer and skiing official (born 1894) 
9 May – Rolf Just Nilsen, singer and actor (born 1931) 
11 May – Odd Hassel, physical chemist and Nobel Laureate (born 1897)
18 May – Ola Høyland, politician (born 1890) 
22 May – Reimar Riefling, classical pianist, music teacher, and music critic (born 1898)
23 May – Johan Georg A. Ræder, diplomat (born 1905)
29 May – Mette Lange-Nielsen, actress (born 1929) 
7 June – Lars Johan Danbolt, priest (born 1895) 
7 June – Asbjørn Listerud, politician (born 1905)
11 June – Kristian Østby, naval aviator (born 1900) 
14 June – Henry Imsland, illustrator (born 1900) 
22 June – Petter Hol, gymnast (born 1883) 
25 June – Otto Hjersing Munthe-Kaas, politician, businessman and military officer (born 1883) 
5 July – Olav Larssen, newspaper editor and politician (born 1894) 
6 July – Kaare Fostervoll, educator and politician (born 1891)
9 July – Nikolai Paul Kornelius Molvik, politician (born 1905)
19 July – John Aalmo, (born 1902) 
31 July – Christian Stray, lawyer and politician (born 1894) 
2 August – Kåre Norum, educator (born 1907).
11 August – Arne Skaare, politician (born 1907)
15 August – Jørgen Løvset, professor of medicine, gynecology and obstetrics (born 1896)
25 August – Jens Gram Dunker, architect (born 1892) 
26 August – Tove Mohr, physician and proponent for women's rights (born 1891) 
28 August – Bjarne Fjærtoft, politician (born 1899)
11 September – Erling Østerberg, police officer (born 1901) 
26 September – Jens Edv. Haugland, politician (born 1924) 
9 October – Per Arneberg, poet, prosaist and translator (born 1901) 
26 October – Olaf Sunde, lawyer and workers' rights activist (born 1915)
31 October – Bent Røiseland, politician (born 1902)
4 November – Sverre Helgesen, high jumper (born 1903)
25 November Sigbjørn Hølmebakk, author (born 1922)
17 December – Ada Kramm, stage and film actress (born 1899) 
18 December – Olav Rasmussen Langeland, politician (born 1904)

Full date unknown
Alf-Jørgen Aas, painter (born 1915)
Tor Hermod Refsum, painter (born 1894) 
Knut Robberstad, jurist and philologist (born 1899)

See also

References

External links